Bloody Jack, fully titled Bloody Jack: Being An Account of the Curious Adventures of Mary “Jacky” Faber, Ship's Boy is a historical novel by L.A. Meyer. It is centered on an orphaned girl in London in the early 19th century. The story is continued in Curse of the Blue Tattoo, Under the Jolly Roger, In the Belly of the Bloodhound, Mississippi Jack, My Bonny Light Horseman, Rapture of the Deep, The Wake of the Lorelei Lee, The Mark of the Golden Dragon, Viva Jacquelina!, Boston Jacky, and Wild Rover No More.

Plot introduction
After losing her entire family to disease, eight-year-old Mary Faber joins a gang of orphans led by Rooster Charlie, whom she looks up to as a brother. One day, after stealing some bread, Mary stumbles across Charlie's corpse and realizes that he's been murdered. Donning his clothes, she assumes the identity of "Jack" and joins the crew of HMS Dolphin as a ship's boy.

While serving aboard the Dolphin, she kills a pirate during an attack on an enemy ship. As a mark of honor, her shipmates give her the nickname "Bloody Jack".

Plot summary

Mary Faber is a member of Rooster Charlie's orphan gang in Cheapside, London, during the late 1790s. After Charlie is murdered by a grave robber, she disguises herself as a boy and seeks passage on the Dolphin, a man of war tasked with hunting pirates. As Mary can read, she is assigned to serve as the schoolmaster's assistant, under the name Jacky Faber. She quickly befriends her fellow boys Tink, Willy, Benjy, and Davy. Jaimy Fletcher, the son of a once-prosperous family, joins the crew at the last second to train as a midshipman.

Over the course of several months, the boys gradually become accomplished sailors. Jacky forms a close bond with Irish seaman Liam Delaney, who teaches her how to play the penny whistle. As Jacky begins to mature, she creates a new uniform to hide the changes; in response, the captain orders her to make uniforms for all the boys. While cruising off the coast of North Africa, the captain spots a pirate ship and pursues it. After battering the vessel into submission, a boarding party including Jacky and Jaimy is sent aboard. During the battle, a pirate carrying the ship's money chest sneaks up on Jaimy, and Jacky manages to shoot him dead, earning her the name "Bloody Jack". Disturbed by the experience, Jacky falls further into depression after learning that Benjy was killed in action. With the Dolphin low on supplies, the crew heads to Palma for rest and relaxation. Jacky begins to menstruate, and mistakingly believes that she will soon die.

After landing at Palma, the boys spend their money on tattoos, declaring themselves the Brotherhood of Ship's Boys. Upon having her first menstrual period, Jacky visits a nearby brothel to learn about her condition. Unaware of the truth, the boys assume that she is a "rake" and taunt her.

Resupplied, the ship travels to the Caribbean Sea to continue its mission. Bliffil, an abusive midshipman, attacks Jacky in the classroom, putting her in the sick ward with severe injuries. Eager for revenge, she persuades another midshipman, Jenkins, to challenge Bliffil to a fight, which he wins. Bill Sloat, another sailor who frequently targets Jacky, discovers her secret and tries to rape her in the ship's rope locker. Jacky manages to stab him with her shiv, and Sloat falls overboard and drowns. Liam is charged with the murder and sentenced to death, but Jacky confesses and is subsequently tried in his place, with the court freeing her on account of self-defense.

With peace restored, Jacky begins to fall in love with Jaimy. When he decides to leave the ship out of fear of being ostracized for homosexuality, she reveals her true identity to him. Soon after they arrive in Kingston, Jamaica, Jacky puts on a dress and goes on a date with Jaimy, only to be interrupted by the other boys. With Jaimy distracting them, she is able to slip into her disguise and maintain her cover. Davy convinces them to all get earrings, which Jaimy and Jacky take as symbols of their love.

While hunting for the French pirate LeFievre ("The Fever"), the Dolphin is attacked by a fireship and begins to sink. While serving as a lookout, Jacky spots land and alerts the crew, allowing them to beach the ship safely. Davy catches her sleeping in Jaimy's hammock, and she reluctantly tells him the truth. Phineas Tilden, the ship's schoolmaster, recruits Jacky to pilot an experimental kite in the hopes of finding help. When the kite breaks free from its moorings, Jacky winds up trapped on a nearby island, where she uses smoke signals to contact the crew. Unfortunately, LeFievre and his men spot the signals and set an ambush for the rescue party. Jacky tries to warn them, but is captured and tied to a rope. The pirates try to hang her, but she is saved seconds before death. In the process, the entire crew discovers her female nature.

Despite earning a promotion to midshipman for bravery, Jacky is discharged from the navy and sent to Boston, where Tilden has arranged for her to attend Lawson Peabody's School for Girls under her assumed name. Accepting her fate, Jacky embraces her shipmates before stepping off.

Characters
 Mary 'Jacky' Faber: The protagonist of the series, she came from a middle-class London family who all died of a plague when she was about seven or eight years old. Suddenly living as a street orphan, she joins a gang led by a slightly older orphan, Rooster Charlie. After Charlie is killed, she enlists with the crew of the H.M.S. Dolphin as a ship's boy.  Jacky exhibits the characteristics of a "Jack" or "Fox" folk hero:  flashing a "foxy" smile, she is charming and sly, good-hearted and adventure seeking, endlessly slipping into and out of trouble, and making sport out of besting her foes.
 Rooster Charlie: He is called Rooster Charlie, both because his last name is Brewster and because of his red hair and how it falls to the side. Though he is not much older than twelve to fourteen years of age himself, he is the leader of a small gang, and is killed for a grudge by a sordid adult.  He was Jacky's closest friend.  When she finds his murdered body, Jacky takes his knife and his clothes and uses them to begin her life as a boy.  Aboard ship, she carves the shiv handle into the likeness of a rooster to honor Charlie.
 James 'Jaimy' Emerson Fletcher: A fellow ship's boy on the H.M.S. Dolphin. He comes from a family that is not poor, but not wealthy enough to buy him a commission as a midshipman. His father enlists him as a ship's boy on the H.M.S. Dolphin.  After Jacky secretly reveals her gender to him, Jaimy and Jacky pledge themselves to one another using gold rings that are put through their ears.
 Liam Delaney: An Irishman and skilled sailor, he is Jacky's overseer and "Sea dad" who gives her tips and rescues her from ill-intentioned men on board.  He does not discover her true gender until it is publicly announced.
 Muck: A corpse seller. He took the corpses of Jacky's family away when they died, murders her best friend, Rooster Charlie, and sells that corpse as well.
 Davy, Willy, Benjy and Tink: Jacky and Jaimy's fellow ship's boys, with whom they form a blood brotherhood.  By the end of the book, they have been separated by rank, and in one case, by death, but the bond the survivors had sworn on as shipboard novices remains strong.

Release details
2002, USA, Harcourt Trade Publishers , Trade Paperback

External links
The author's website
Publisher's site
Review by Tom Knapp
Audiobook Publishers Website

2002 American novels
Children's historical novels
Novels about pirates
American historical novels
American children's novels
Novels about orphans
Novels set in London
Novels set on ships
2002 children's books
Cross-dressing in literature